Muscina pascuorum is a species of house flies, etc. in the family Muscidae. It is found in Europe.

References

Muscidae
Articles created by Qbugbot
Insects described in 1826